Shareef Abdul-Kadhim Masabih Al-Imari (born 7 June 1996) is an Iraqi footballer who plays as a midfielder for Al-Quwa Al-Jawiya in the Iraqi Premier League.

International career
On 26 November 2019, Shareef made his first international cap with Iraq against Qatar in the 24th Arabian Gulf Cup.

Honours

Club
Al-Quwa Al-Jawiya
 Iraqi Premier League: 2020–21
 Iraq FA Cup: 2020–21

References

External links

1996 births
Living people
Iraqi footballers
Iraq international footballers
Association football midfielders
Al-Quwa Al-Jawiya players
People from Nasiriyah